European route E 88 is part of the international E-road network.

Route 

: Ankara
: Ankara — Sivas — Refahiye

External links 
 UN Economic Commission for Europe: Overall Map of E-road Network (2007)
International E-road network

88
E088